This list of dental schools in the United Kingdom includes all eighteen Dental Schools or Schools of Medicine and Dentistry in the United Kingdom which are recognised by the General Dental Council and lead to a dental degree of a British university. There are twelve such schools in England, four in Scotland, one in Wales and one in Northern Ireland.   The list is ordered by country and name, and includes the founding date of the Dental School or its parent/associated Medical School. The Dental Schools Council represents the interests of all UK Dental Schools.

England

Schools only offering DCP and postgraduate education
 University of Portsmouth Dental Academy. Opened in 2005 and offers three programmes of study:
 Foundation Award in Science and Dental Therapy
 BSc (Hons) Dental Hygiene and Dental Therapy
 CertHE Dental Nursing

 University of Essex
 BSc Oral Health Sciences
 MSc Advanced Periodontal Practice (Dental Care Professional)
 MSc Periodontology (Dentists)

 University of Suffolk (under planning, not yet opened)

Scotland

Wales

Northern Ireland

See also
List of pharmacy schools in the United Kingdom
List of medical schools in the United Kingdom
Medical school in the United Kingdom
Medical education in the United Kingdom

Notes and references

External links
University of Portsmouth, School of Professionals Complementary to Dentistry
British Academy of Cosmetic Dentistry
Top Dental Schools in UK 

 
Dental
United Kingdom
United Kingdom health-related lists